Maurice White (born 9 April 1933) is a Pakistani former amateur boxer. He competed in the men's featherweight event at the 1956 Summer Olympics. At the 1956 Summer Olympics, he lost to Tristán Falfán of Argentina in the Round of 16 after receiving a bye in the Round of 32.

References

External links
 

1933 births
Living people
Featherweight boxers
Pakistani male boxers
Olympic boxers of Pakistan
Boxers at the 1956 Summer Olympics
Place of birth missing (living people)
20th-century Pakistani people